Metal tolerance may refer to:
 The standard tolerance to metals that all organisms possess through metal homeostasis
 The extreme tolerance to metals exhibited by hyperaccumulator species